György Handel (20 March 1959 – 16 January 2021) was a Hungarian footballer. 

He played once for the Hungary national football team. He died on 16 January 2021, from COVID-19 during the COVID-19 pandemic in Hungary.

References

External links

1959 births
2021 deaths
Footballers from Budapest
Association football forwards
Hungarian footballers
Hungarian expatriate footballers
Hungarian expatriate sportspeople in Malta
Expatriate footballers in Malta
MTK Budapest FC players
Rákospalotai EAC footballers
BFC Siófok players
Veszprém LC footballers
Győri ETO FC players
Luqa St. Andrew's F.C. players
Nadur Youngsters F.C. players
Qormi F.C. players
Nemzeti Bajnokság I players
Maltese Premier League players
Deaths from the COVID-19 pandemic in Hungary